Bishan station usually refers to a train station named Bishan located in either Singapore or China.

Bishan station can refer to:

Singapore

Bishan MRT station, a metro station in Bishan, Singapore

China

Bishan station (Chongqing Rail Transit), a metro station in Chongqing, China
Bishan railway station, a railway station in Chongqing, China

See also
 Bishan (disambiguation)